Frédérique Léhon (born 29 October 1980) is a French rhythmic gymnast. She competed in the women's group all-around event at the 1996 Summer Olympics.

References

1980 births
Living people
French rhythmic gymnasts
Olympic gymnasts of France
Gymnasts at the 1996 Summer Olympics
People from Boulogne-sur-Mer
Sportspeople from Pas-de-Calais